Rodulfus Tortarius ( 1063 in Gien – c. 1122) was a French Benedictine monk of the Abbey of Fleury-sur-Loire, and a poet writing in Latin. A very early version of the story of Amys and Amylion occurs in his work.

He versified the Facta et dicta memorabilia of Valerius Maximus. His range was from comic tales to hagiography, with a Miracles of Saint Benedict.

References
 Marbury Bladen Ogle, Dorothy M. Schullian, editors, Rodulfi Tortarii Carmina, Papers and Monographs of the American Academy in Rome, Vol. VIII, [Rome:] American Academy in Rome, 1933.
 François Bar, Les épîtres latines de Raoul le Tourtier; etude de sources. La Legende d'Ami et Amile

Notes

External links
 

1060s births
1120s deaths
People from Gien
French poets
French Benedictines
French Catholic poets
Medieval Latin poets
French male poets
12th-century French poets
12th-century Latin writers